Virgil is a fictional character from the television series The Walking Dead, where he is portrayed by Kevin Carroll.

Television series

Season 10
In the first part finale "The World Before", Michonne, Judith, and Luke travel to Oceanside, where a man named Virgil is captured and Michonne threatens him with death if he doesn't explain himself. Luke recognizes him as the one who saved him in the library. Before he can explain, the group is attacked by walkers. Virgil later explains he was just looking for supplies and wants to get back to his family. They live on a fortified naval base, but it is hard to find. Michonne agrees to help Virgil find his family in exchange for weapons from the base to destroy Alpha's horde. In the morning, Michonne leaves Judith a walkie-talkie for them to communicate and they say their goodbyes. Michonne and Virgil then sail away on a boat toward the island.

In the episode "What We Become", Michonne and Virgil use a boat to travel to Bloodsworth Island, an abandoned naval base where he claims his family and a stash of weapons can be found. Virgil soon admits his family is dead but are still reanimated as walkers, and he asks for Michonne's help to put them down. Michonne helps clear the base of walkers, finds Virgil's family who had hanged themselves within a cell, and helps Virgil to put them to rest and bury them. Virgil promises to lead Michonne to the weapons the next day. That night, Michonne is caught in a trap set by Virgil. Virgil's allies, trapped in an adjacent cell, warn Michonne that Virgil has gone insane since he inadvertently locked his family in the cell while they went scavenging, leading to their hanging. Virgil feeds Michonne some drugged food, giving her hallucinations. As the drugs wear off and Michonne regains her senses, Virgil offers her water, and she uses the opportunity to attack him. Virgil flees, leaving the door open behind him; Michonne helps the others out of their cell, and the four of them head to the docks but discover that Virgil set Michonne's boat aflame, leaving them stranded on the island. The four of them track down and capture Virgil; while his former allies want to kill him, Michonne shows mercy and is able to reason with Virgil and convinces him to help. Virgil shows Michonne a room full of scavenged gear, and she recognizes Rick's boots among the items. She demands to know where Virgil found them, and he takes her to a nearby beached military boat. Michonne and the others plan to take the boat back to the mainland, but Virgil opts to stay on the island instead. In the second part finale "A Certain Doom", after collapsing on the road, Connie is found by Virgil, who is revealed to have returned to the mainland and traveled to Oceanside only to find it empty.

Season 11
In the episode "On the Inside", Connie and Virgil shelter in a house they find in the woods while on the run from walkers. At the house, while checking to see if it's clear, Connie spots eyes looking back at her through the bathroom mirror. She takes Virgil to the bathroom, but the eyes are gone. As they walk back to the main room, a moving wall closes between them, trapping them in different rooms. Connie is attacked by a feral person and escapes; Virgil is also attacked but manages to stab the feral. In the room, Virgil tells Connie to leave him, but she insists that she's not leaving, and he agrees to go with her. They run out of the room with and are ambushed by the feral people. While fighting, Virgil is stabbed repeatedly. Connie hides Virgil behind her and covers herself in guts from a dead feral, before letting the walkers in to devour the ferals. Connie and Virgil are attacked again outside, but the ferals are killed by Kelly who finally finds her sister with the help of Magna, Carol and Rosita after having learned of Connie's survival from a surviving Whisperer. In the first part finale "For Blood", Virgil recovers from his injuries during a storm at Alexandria, but he helps Judith and Gracie when walkers swarm the house.

Development and reception
Kevin Carroll was cast as Virgil, a survivor who seeks Michonne's help to look for his family. The tenth season first part finale "The World Before" features the first appearance of Virgil. Erik Kain of Forbes wrote in his review of the episode that "Virgil seems like a good enough guy. Then again, Dante didn't seem so bad, either." Writing for TV Fanatic, Paul Dailly said in his review, "Virgil fought hard to return to his family, and it was a commendable battle. Even in the face of death, his family was his sole concern. His words struck a chord with Michonne because she was against the prospect of trusting anyone else."

In his review of the episode "What We Become", Josh Wigler of The Hollywood Reporter describes Virgil as "a man driven mad from the grief of losing his own family". Noetta Harjo of Geek Girl Authority wrote that "Virgil said he came from an island that was an old naval research facility. Which is true, but Virgil lied. First of all, his family is dead. And secondly, he doesn't know if there are any weapons on the island.  He just wanted to go back to the island because he promised his wife he'd give her flowers everyday. I knew it was too good to be true." Matt Fowler of IGN wrote, "As it turned out, all of our instincts were right about Virgil [...] Not that he was an evil person, per se, but that he was 'off.' He'd snapped. His family was dead and his claims of a weapons cache was a soft lie. Michonne was led into a Navy Research Facility because Virgil wanted her to put down the undead versions of his wife and kids, whom he'd accidentally trapped inside a building with walkers. He wanted to bury them properly and he needed her sword skills. Through this crucible, Virgil got to briefly become a Scarecrow-type villain, capturing Michonne in a Saw bathroom and dosing her with some type of psychotropic drug that put her through the mental wringer." Aaron Neuwirth of "We Live Entertainment" wrote that "Virgil did not seem like the most trustworthy person, but to what extent he wasn't on the level, I was not sure. The fact that his family had already been dead was easy to see coming, but I was more surprised by the presence of other people being held captive. Still, that's nothing compared to the full-on drug trip he put Michonne on, leading into more of the 'What If?' scenario teased in the cold open [...] I'm actually pleased with where the show leaves Virgil. We understand him, and he's not suddenly better. Instead, he'll be in solitude on an island, placing flowers at his family's gravesite. It's sad, but it's alright for him." Alex McLevy writing for The A.V. Club said that "Virgil's 'I trusted you, and you ruined it!' pretty nicely conveys his warped worldview." Writing in his review for TV Fanatic, Paul Dailly wrote: "despite the frustration of Virgil double-crossing her, he will be remembered as the person who helped her on a level she didn't think she needed [...] Initially, it was frustrating that Virgil locked her up, but it highlighted the fact that Michonne took a big risk by leaving her kids and friends behind, getting on a boat with some dude who promised her weapons, and making her way to an island that could signal the end of her life [...] Virgil was a complicated man, but he never strayed from taking the flowers to the grave every day. The apocalypse changed his life forever, and the only solace he could find was taking those darn flowers to the grave every single day."

He later found Connie near Oceanside, albeit weak and malnourished. In his review of the second part finale "A Certain Doom", for IGN, Matt Fowler wrote that "Virgil, from Michonne's final episode "What We Become," has meandered out of his hermit state and joined the ranks of our heroes. With him folding into the group, more people will learn about the Rick clues and the Three Rings and all that." Erik Kain of Forbes wrote: "Virgil, you may recall, seemed like a nice enough guy until he turned out to be totally nuts. I'm not sure if him showing up is a good or a bad thing for Connie. Maybe both."

Ron Hogan for Den of Geek reviewed the season 11 episode "On the Inside" and said that "Virgil's concern for Connie seems genuine, as the actress portrays the character's lack of sleep through manic expressions and the wide-but-exhausted eyes of a child desperately trying to avoid bedtime. The communication between the two characters is rough, but effective, and their physical distance from one another throughout most of the episode works great, because it puts Connie in danger." Rob Bricken from Gizmodo commented that "Virgil has become a pretty good dude. After being a mess to Michonne back in season 10, he gives Connie his knife to ensure she can get away. He says Michonne gave him a chance (by sparing him) which he's certain needs to be passed to Connie. I’m happy he was rescued."

References

The Walking Dead (franchise) characters